Katie Pycroft (Hall) is an English actress and soprano.

Pycroft was born in Oakham, Rutland in the English East Midlands on 31 August 1990.  She attended the public school in Oakham and went on to become a graduate of the National Youth Music Theatre. She also attended Peterborough High School for part of her senior education.  Her parents, John Graham Hall and Helen Williams, were both professional opera singers.

She played Cosette in the 2010 25th-anniversary version of Les Misérables at The O2 Arena and Christine in The Phantom of the Opera in the UK tour in 2012. She also had a small cameo in the 2012 film production of Les Misérables.  In 2013, she was cast as Maria in the UK tour of West Side Story. In 2015, she was chosen by the English National Opera to play Johanna Barker in Sweeney Todd: The Demon Barber of Fleet Street. In 2018, she began playing Fantine in the UK and Ireland Tour of Les Misérables.

References

External links
 

1990 births
Living people
British actresses
English film actresses
English musical theatre actresses
English stage actresses